Prichsenstadt is a town in the district of Kitzingen, Lower Franconia, Bavaria, Germany.

References

Kitzingen (district)